Fusafjorden is a fjord in Vestland county, Norway. It lies in between Bjørnafjorden Municipality and Tysnes Municipality. The Fusafjorden is a wide fjord that branches into three arms at Bogøya. The three arms are Samnangerfjorden, Ådlandsfjorden, and Eikelandsfjorden.

See also
 List of Norwegian fjords

References

Fjords of Vestland
Bjørnafjorden
Tysnes